Smoke Lightning is a 1933 American Pre-Code Western film directed by David Howard and written by Sidney D. Mitchell and Gordon Rigby. The film stars George O'Brien, Nell O'Day, Betsy King Ross, Frank Atkinson, Clarence Wilson and Morgan Wallace. It is based on the story "Cañon Walls" by Zane Grey. The film was released on February 17, 1933, by Fox Film Corporation.

Plot
Blake (E. Alyn Warren) commits suicide after Smoke (George O'Brien) wins the Blake ranch in a poker game, and Smoke transfers the ranch to Blake's little daughter (Betsy King Ross). The Sheriff (Morgan Wallace), on the other hand, is after the ranch and has Smoke arrested for the murder of Blake, before bringing in a fake relative to appear as the girl's relative.

Cast      
George O'Brien as Smoke Mason
Nell O'Day as Dorothy Benson
Betsy King Ross as Betsy Blake
Frank Atkinson as Alf Bailey
Clarence Wilson as Deputy Jake Tully
Morgan Wallace as Sheriff Archie Kyle
Virginia Sale as Housekeeper Sawyer
E. Alyn Warren as Carter Blake
Douglass Dumbrille as Sam Edson
Richard Carle as Parson

References

External links
 

1933 films
Fox Film films
American Western (genre) films
1933 Western (genre) films
Films directed by David Howard
Films based on works by Zane Grey
American black-and-white films
Films scored by Arthur Lange
1930s English-language films
1930s American films